The NXT Women's Championship is a women's professional wrestling world championship created and promoted by the American professional wrestling promotion WWE on the NXT brand.

The championship is generally contested in professional wrestling matches, in which participants execute scripted finishes rather than contend in direct competition. The inaugural champion was Paige, who won the title on NXT on June 20, 2013. Roxanne Perez is the current champion in her first reign. She defeated Mandy Rose on the December 13, 2022 episode of NXT in Orlando, FL.

Charlotte Flair and Shayna Baszler are tied for the most reigns at two. Asuka is the longest reigning champion at 510 days, beginning on April 1, 2016, and ending on August 24, 2017; however, WWE recognizes the reign as 522 days, with it ending on September 6, 2017, the date the episode in which she vacated the title aired on tape delay. Kairi Sane has the shortest reign at 71 days; however, WWE recognizes Charlotte Flair's second reign as the shortest at 63 days due to tape delay (in reality, Flair held the title for either 73 or 74 days; the exact date that she won the title is unknown). Paige is the youngest champion, winning it at the age of 20, while Shayna Baszler is the oldest, winning the championship at 38. Only three women have held the title for a continuous reign of one year (365 days) or more: Asuka, Shayna Baszler and Mandy Rose.

Title history

Combined reigns 

See also
 Women's championships in WWE
 Women in WWE

References

External links 
 Official NXT Women's Championship title history

WWE NXT championships
WWE championships lists
WWE women's championships
Women's professional wrestling championships lists